Damasena was a Western Kshatrapa ruler, who reigned from 223 to 232 CE. From the reign of Rudrasimha I, the date of minting of each coin, reckoned in the Saka era, is usually written on the obverse behind the king's head in Brahmi numerals, allowing for the quite precise dating of the rule of each king. This is a rather uncommon case in Indian numismatics. Some, such as the numismatist R.C Senior considered that these dates might correspond to the much earlier Azes era instead.

Notes

References
 Rapson, "A Catalogue of Indian coins in the British Museum. Andhras etc..."

Western Satraps